Munichi is a recently extinct language which was spoken in the village of Munichis, about 10 miles (16 km) west of Yurimaguas, Loreto Region, Peru. In 1988, there were two mother-tongue speakers, but they had not met since the 1970s. The last known fluent speaker, Victoria Huancho Icahuate, died in the late 1990s. As of 2009 there were several semi-speakers who retained significant lexical, and partial grammatical, knowledge of the language (Michael et al. 2013).

It is also called Balsapuertiño, named after the village of Balsapuerto in the department of Loreto, Peru.

Word order in Munichi is VSO.

Other varieties
Unattested "Munichi stock" varieties listed by Loukotka (1968):

Tabaloso - spoken in Loreto department in the village of Tabalosa on the Mayo River
Chasutino (Cascoasoa) - once spoken in the village of Chasuta on the Huallaga River; now only Quechua is spoken.
Huatama (Otanavi) - once spoken in the villages of San José de Sisa and Otanahui in the same region; now only Quechua is spoken.
Lama (Lamista) - extinct language once spoken on the Moyobamba River. The last survivors now speak only Quechua or Spanish.
Suchichi (Suriche) - extinct language once spoken in the village of Tarapoto in the same region
Zapaso - extinct language from the same region, once spoken on the Saposoa River
Nindaso - once spoken on the Huallaga River north of the Zapaso tribe
Nomona - once spoken on the left bank of the Saposoa River

Varieties listed by Mason (1950):

Muniche
Muchimo
Otanabe
Churitana

Classification 
The language is considered an isolate (Michael et al. 2013), but the pronominal suffixes bear a close resemblance to those reconstructed for proto-Arawakan (Gibson 1996:18-19), and some lexical items are similar to ones in Arawakan languages (Jolkesky 2016:310-317). Although Jolkesky (id.) argues that the language belongs to a putative Macro-Arawakan stock, evidence has yet to be provided for placing it either in a sister branch to the Arawakan language family or in a branch within this language family. There is substantial borrowing from the local variety of Quechua, and to a lesser extent from Spanish and Cahuapanan languages (Michael et al. 2013).

Language contact
Jolkesky (2016) notes that there are lexical similarities with the Cholon-Hibito, Kechua, and Mochika language families due to contact.

Phonology 
Munichi has six vowels: /a, e, i, ɨ, o, u/.

Vocabulary
Loukotka (1968) lists the following basic vocabulary items for Munichi.

{| class="wikitable sortable"
! gloss !! Munichi
|-
| one || wuítsa
|-
| two || utspa
|-
| three || uchuma
|-
| head || óke
|-
| ear || épue
|-
| tooth || dé
|-
| fire || chúshe
|-
| stone || sögte
|-
| sun || xowá
|-
| moon || spáltsi
|-
| maize || sáa
|-
| dog || xíno
|-
| boat || niasúta
|}

References

Bibliography

 Gibson, Michael L. 1996. El Munichi: Un idioma que se extingue. Serie Lingüística Peruana, 42. Pucallpa: Instituto Lingüístico de Verano. Available here.
 Jolkesky, M. 2016. Estudo arqueo-ecolinguístico das terras tropicais sul-americanas. Brasilia: UnB. PhD Dissertation. Available here.
 Michael, Lev, Stephanie Farmer, Greg Finley, Christine Beier, and Karina Sullón Acosta. 2013. A sketch of Muniche segmental and prosodic phonology. International Journal of American Linguistics 79(3):307-347.
Michael, L.; Beier, Ch.; Acosta, K. S.; Farmer, S.; Finley, G.; Roswell, M. (2009). Dekyunáwa: Un diccionario de nuestro idioma muniche. (Manuscript).

Extinct languages of South America
Language isolates of South America
Languages of Peru
Indigenous languages of the Americas
Languages extinct in the 1990s
Verb–subject–object languages